Crossgates is a village in the Borough of Scarborough, North Yorkshire, England, situated between Seamer to the west and Eastfield to the east separating the A64 and the B1261 roads which intersect there. Seamer railway station is situated in Crossgates.

The village was built after the Second World War. New houses were built in the village in 2000.  Nearby points of interest include Star Carr, a Mesolithic archaeological site.

Towns nearby include Scarborough and Filey. Crossgates is considered a part of Seamer.

Crossgates is home to a disused limestone quarry.

References

External links
Crossgates on a navigable 1947 map

Borough of Scarborough
Villages in North Yorkshire